Elections to the Kingstown Urban District Council took place on Monday 16 January 1899 as part of local elections that year. Following the election, T. W. Robinson was elected council Chairman.

Results by party

Ward Results

Monkstown

West

East

Glasthule

References

Kingstown
Elections in Dún Laoghaire–Rathdown